Yang Liyu (born 13 February 1997) is a Chinese footballer who currently plays for Guangzhou Evergrande in the Chinese Super League.

Club career
Yang Liyu started his football career when he joined Campeonato de Portugal side Gondomar from Wuhan Zall in 2015. He made his debut for the club on 8 May 2016 in a 1–0 loss against Anadia, where he was sent off in 56th minute. He was officially promoted to the first team squad in the summer of 2016. He played six league matches for the club in the 2016-17 season.

On 26 January 2016, Yang was loaned out to Chinese Super League side Tianjin Teda for one season. He made his debut for the club on 4 March 2017 in a 2–0 away loss against Shandong Luneng. He scored his first goal for the club on 9 August 2017 in a 3–1 away loss against Yanbian Funde. He scored his second goal for the club on 27 September 2017 in a 3–1 home win against Guizhou Hengfeng. Yang refused to extend his loan with the club at the end of the 2017 season.

On 24 December 2017, Yang transferred to fellow top tier side Guangzhou Evergrande. He made his debut for the club on 14 February 2018 in a 1–1 home draw against Buriram United in the 2018 AFC Champions League, coming on as a substitute for Alan Carvalho in the 80th minute. He scored his first goal for the club on 11 August 2018 in a 3–2 away loss against Changchun Yatai. He scored his second goal for the club on 2 September 2018 in a 2–1 win against Shanghai Shenhua, scoring the winner. The following season he would go on to establish himself as a vital member of the team that went on to win the 2019 Chinese Super League title.

International career
Yang was called up to the Chinese national team by Marcello Lippi for the first time in November 2017 for the 2017 EAFF E-1 Football Championship. He made his international debut on 9 December 2017 in a 2–2 draw against South Korea.

Career statistics

Club statistics

International statistics

Honours

Club
Guangzhou Evergrande
Chinese Super League: 2019
Chinese FA Super Cup: 2018

Individual
Chinese Super League Team of the Year: 2019

References

External links
 
 

1997 births
Living people
Chinese footballers
Footballers from Chongqing
Tianjin Jinmen Tiger F.C. players
Guangzhou F.C. players
Chinese Super League players
Segunda Divisão players
Chinese expatriate footballers
Expatriate footballers in Portugal
Chinese expatriate sportspeople in Portugal
Association football forwards
China international footballers